Granville Nissanka de Silva (born March 12, 1955, in Colombo) is a Sri Lankan former cricketer who played four ODI matches between 1983 and 1985.

External links 
 Cricinfo article on Granville de Silva

1955 births
Living people
Sri Lanka One Day International cricketers
Sri Lankan cricketers